Systel, Inc. is a US-based multinational firm focusing on integrated technology and business services, mostly utilizing temporary H-1B visa workers. Headquartered in Alpharetta, Georgia, along with development centers located in India and the United States. Systel is a certified minority business enterprise.

History 

1997: The Company was founded by Madhu Chintalapati & is Incorporated in Delaware
1997: Established capabilities in Infrastructure and Technology Management in Michigan 
2005: Headquarters of the company was moved to Atlanta
2005: Established offshore offices in India
2008: Expanded capabilities in Enterprise and Custom Applications
2016: New Systel office in Hitech city, Hyderabad

Leadership 
Madhu Chintalapati is the Managing Director of the company.
Amina Jafery is CEO of the company.

Services and operations 
Business process Strategy provides HR strategy, technology strategy and operations strategy services.
Systel Consulting specializes in the areas of technology, business and management consulting.
Systel’s Digital wing provides digital technology, analytics, mobility services and IoT. 
Systel Technology focuses on technology, implementation, delivery, and research & development
Operations focuses on an "as-a-service" model of service delivery. This includes business process outsourcing, IT services, cloud services, managed operations, security and infrastructure services.

Awards and recognitions

 Spirit of Alliance: Supplier of the Year - 2014 

 E-Governance Excellence Award 2015 awarded by State Government of Telangana

 Regional Supplier of the Year CAT III Award for the year 2015 by National Minority Supplier Development Council 
 Received USPAACC Fast 100 Asian American companies in 2016

Notes

International information technology consulting firms
Companies based in Atlanta